Bolshaya Vereyka is a rural locality (a selo) and the administrative center of Bolshevereyskoye Rural Settlement, Ramonsky District, Voronezh Oblast, Russia. The population was 862 as of 2010. There are 11 streets.

Geography 
Bolshaya Vereyka is located 46 km northwest of Ramon (the district's administrative centre) by road. Lebyazhye is the nearest rural locality.

References 

Rural localities in Ramonsky District